Cheryl Sarah Bart AO is an Australian lawyer and company director. She is also the first Australian female and the 31st person worldwide to complete the Explorer's Grand Slam.

Early life and education
Bart was educated at Moriah College in Sydney and graduated from the University of New South Wales with degrees in Commerce and Law.

Career
She began her career as a banking and finance lawyer at Mallesons Stephen Jaques.

Bart has been the Chairman  of the Foundation for Alcohol Research and Education (FARE), ANZ Trustees Limited, the South Australian Film Corporation, the Adelaide Film Festival, and the South Australian Environmental Protection Authority. She is also serves as a non-executive director on numerous company boards including: Spark Infrastructure Limited, ETSA Utitilies, Shaw of Australia, Audio pixels Limited, and the Buckland Foundation.

On 3 June 2010, she commenced a five-year term on the Board of the Australian Broadcasting Corporation.

She currently serves as Non Executive Director on the boards of ME Bank, SG Fleet Ltd, Audio Pixels Holdings Ltd, Football Federation Australia (FFA), the Prince's Trust Australia, Invictus Games Sydney 2018, Moriah Foundation and TEDxSydney. She is an Ambassador for the Australian Himalayan Foundation and Patron of Sports Connect. Bart is a member of YPO Greater Sydney and of Chief Executive Women.

In 2009, Bart was appointed an Officer of the Order of Australia.

Bart is the first Australian female and the 31st person worldwide to complete the Explorer's Grand Slam. Namely, the Seven Summits plus skiing, unsupported, to the North Pole and the South Pole. She completed the North Pole on 22 April 2013.

Family
Cheryl Bart is married to Fred Bart, also a company director, and has two children. On 23 May 2008, Bart and her 23-year-old daughter Nikki became the first mother-daughter team to reach the summit of Mount Everest. The scaling of Everest also saw them complete the "Seven Summits" challenge: climbing the highest mountains in each continent. Her father, Emeric Klinghoffer, was a Hungarian concentration camp survivor, and her mother was Polish. Her daughter is Nikki Bart, with whom she became part of the first mother-daughter team to summit Mount Everest and complete the Seven Summits.

References

External links
 Chicks with Altitude website

                   

Lawyers from Sydney
Officers of the Order of Australia
Australian mountain climbers
Australian summiters of Mount Everest
Australian people of Hungarian descent
Australian people of Polish descent
Living people
Board members of the Australian Broadcasting Corporation
Australian women in business
University of New South Wales Law School alumni
Female climbers
Summiters of the Seven Summits
Year of birth missing (living people)
People educated at Moriah College